Jurek Jatowitt (born 21 February 1952) is an Austrian judoka. He competed in the men's middleweight event at the 1976 Summer Olympics.

References

1952 births
Living people
Austrian male judoka
Olympic judoka of Austria
Judoka at the 1976 Summer Olympics
People from Sopot
20th-century Austrian people